The 1944 United States Senate election in Vermont took place on November 7, 1944. Incumbent Republican George Aiken ran successfully for re-election to another term in the United States Senate, defeating Democratic nominee Harry W. Witters.

Republican primary

Results

Democratic primary

Results

General election

Candidates
George Aiken, incumbent U.S. Senator
Harry W. Witters, lawyer and former WPA Administrator

Endorsements

Results

References

Vermont
1944
1944 Vermont elections